Zwickau Hauptbahnhof is the main railway station of Zwickau in the German state of Saxony.

History 
On 18 September 1845 Zwickau was connected by a branch line to the Leipzig–Reichenbach railway line. This was followed on 11 May 1858 by the line to Schwarzenberg, on 15 November 1858 by the line to Chemnitz and on 29 November 1875 by the line to Falkenstein.

The first station building was a wooden structure built in 1845. This soon no longer met increasing requirements and had to be replaced by a new building, which was completed in 1858.

The current station building was designed by Deutsche Reichsbahn architect Otto Falk, built from 1933 to 1936 and opened on 17 December 1936.

Location
The station is separated from the inner city and the Neumarkt and Zentralhaltestelle bus interchanges located there. Lines 5 and 7 of the Zwickau tramway network and bus lines 16 and 19 of the Zwickau Municipal Transport Authority (Städtische Verkehrsbetriebe Zwickau) connect the station with the city centre. In addition, many regional bus services begin at the station, which are mainly operated by the West Saxony Regional Transport Authority (Regionalverkehrsbetriebe Westsachsen).

Zwickau model
A special feature is the Zwickau model of tram-train operations. BOStrab-compliant RegioSprinters of the Vogtlandbahn run over tram tracks to the Zwickau central (Zentrum) tram stop. Tram-trains run from the Zwickau–Schwarzenberg line at street level to the Stadthalle tram stop. The metre-gauge line has a third rail fitted to allow standard gauge vehicles to continue to the Zentrum tram stop. The RegioSprinters are diesel-powered as most of the Vogtlandbahn network is not electrified and the vehicles are slightly narrower than normal because the tram line does not have sufficient clearance for full-width standard gauge vehicles.

Rail services
The following services operate through Zwickau:

Notes

External links 

 Zwickau (Sachs) Hbf bei www.sachsenschiene.de

Railway stations in Saxony
Railway stations in Germany opened in 1845
Zwickau
Buildings and structures completed in 1858
Buildings and structures completed in 1936
Buildings and structures in Zwickau (district)